Anthony Salvin (1799–1881) was an English architect, born in Sunderland Bridge, County Durham.  He trained under John Paterson of Edinburgh, and moved to London in 1821.  His works include new churches, restoration of and additions to existing churches, and various other buildings, including schools.  However, he is mainly noted for his work on existing major buildings, including castles, and for designing new substantial country houses.  The castles on which he worked include Windsor Castle, Norwich Castle, Rockingham Castle, Newark Castle, Warkworth Castle, Muncaster Castle, and Warwick Castle.  He also carried out work on the Tower of London, and on Trinity College, Cambridge, Gonville and Caius College, Cambridge, and University College, Durham.  His new country houses include Mamhead House (his first major project), Scotney Castle, Keele Hall, Thoresby Hall, and Peckforton Castle.  In addition he designed the Observatory for Durham University.

This list contains buildings and structures not included in the See also section (below).

Key

Works

See also
List of new churches by Anthony Salvin
List of church restorations and alterations by Anthony Salvin
List of work on castles and country houses by Anthony Salvin

References

Bibliography